Meryem is a feminine Turkish given name. It is the Turkish form of Maryam, and is the name used in Turkey to refer to Mary, the mother of Jesus.

Meriem is another variant form, found as a given name and surname of North African origin.

People with this given name
 Meryem Aboulouafa, Moroccan singer and songwriter
 Meryem Altun (1976–2002), Turkish political prisoner
 Meryem Bekmez (born 2000), Turkish race walker
 Meryem Betül Çavdar (born 2000), Turkish Para Taekwondo practitioner
 Meryem Boz Çalık (born 1988), Turkish volleyball player
 Meryem Erdoğan (born 1990), Ethiopian-born Turkish female long-distance runner
 Meryem Koç (born 1996), Turkish footballer
 Meryem Özyumşak (born 1979), Turkish football manager and former goalkeeper
 Meryem Uslu (born 1987), German kickboxer of Turkish origin
 Meryem Uzerli (born 1982), Turkish-German actress
 Princess Lalla Meryem of Morocco (born 1962)
 Meryem Yamak (born 1962), German football manager and former footballer of Turkish origin

People with this family name
 Camel Meriem (born 1979), French footballer

Fictional characters
 Meryem, protagonist of Ethos, a Turkish drama television series
 Meryem, character in Hunter × Hunter, a Japanese manga series

Media 
 Meryem, 2020 album by the Moroccan singer Meryem Aboulouafa

See also
 Maryam (disambiguation)
 Miriam (disambiguation)
 Maryam (sura), the 19th sura, or chapter, of the Qur'an
 Islamic view of Mary
 Grand Prix SAR La Princesse Lalla Meryem, tennis tournament held in Rabat, Morocco

Turkish feminine given names